Raphoe South, or South Raphoe, is a barony in County Donegal, Republic of Ireland. Baronies were mainly cadastral rather than administrative units. They acquired modest local taxation and spending functions in the 19th century before being superseded by the Local Government (Ireland) Act 1898.

Etymology
Raphoe South takes its name from Raphoe town, in Irish Ráth Bhoth, "ringfort of the huts."

Geography

Raphoe South is located in the centre of County Donegal; the River Finn flows through it.

History

Raphoe South was the ancient territory of the O'Mulligan, O'Pattan, McGlinchy and McCrossans. The barony of Raphoe was divided into South and North between 1807 and 1821.

List of settlements

Below is a list of settlements in Raphoe South:

Ballybofey
Castlefinn
Convoy
Killygordon

References

Baronies of County Donegal